Norway was represented by Arne Bendiksen, with the song "Spiral", at the 1964 Eurovision Song Contest, which took place on 21 March in Copenhagen. "Spiral" was chosen as the Norwegian entry at the Melodi Grand Prix (MGP) on 15 February.

Before Eurovision

Melodi Grand Prix 1964
The MGP was held at the studios of the Norwegian Broadcasting Corporation in Oslo, hosted by Odd Grythe. Five songs took part in the final with each song sung twice by different singers, once with a small combo and once with a full orchestra. The winning song was chosen by an "expert" jury.

At Eurovision 
On the night of the final Bendiksen performed third in the running order, following the Netherlands and preceding Denmark. Each national jury awarded 5-3-1 to their top three songs, and at the close "Spiral" had picked up 6 points (5 from Denmark and 1 from Finland), placing Norway 8th of the 16 entries. The Norwegian jury awarded its 5 points to the United Kingdom.

Voting

References 

1964
Countries in the Eurovision Song Contest 1964
1964
Eurovision
Eurovision